The following is a list of statues in India by height.

Over

Below

Under construction / planned 
 Three more statues by the Isha Foundation, which already has 34 meter Adiyogi Shiva statue at Coimbatore, plans to erect such statues in three more locations in the eastern, western and northern parts of India—in Varanasi, Mumbai and Delhi.

See also

 List of tallest statues in the world
 List of tallest freestanding structures
 List of the tallest statues in the United States
 List of colossal sculpture in situ
 Sculpture in the Indian subcontinent
 New Seven Wonders of the World
 List of statues

Notes

References 
   https://www.livehindustan.com/bihar/sitamarhi/story-251-feet-statue-of-mata-sita-will-be-installed-at-the-birth-place-5810592.html

Statues, tallest
[[Category:About Sardar Patel|Sardar Patel Statue]]
India, tallest
Statues, India
S
Tallest